Judge Dredd: Dreddline is a Big Finish Productions audio drama based on the character Judge Dredd in British comic 2000 AD.

Plot
Judge Dredd is assigned to escort safecracker Bax Philo from Brit-Cit to Mega-City One, aboard a supersonic Transatlantic train.  But shortly after the train exits the station, it is taken over by a terrorist group, led by an old acquaintance of Dredd seeking revenge on him and the whole city.

Cast
Toby Longworth - Judge Dredd
Jeremy James - Bax Philo
Kate Brown - Whyte
Donovan Cary - Lomax
Andrew Fettes - Trio
Nicholas Briggs - Buzz
Hannah Smith - Judge Dalton
Jason Mitchell - Conductor Bot

External links
Big Finish Productions

2003 audio plays
Judge Dredd